Aram Yerganian (20 May 1900 – 2 August 1934) was an Armenian revolutionary who was noted for his assassination of Behaeddin Sakir and Fatali Khan Khoyski as an act of vengeance for their roles in the Armenian genocide and the massacre of Armenians in Baku respectively. He is considered an Armenian national hero.

Early life 
Aram Yerganian was born in Erzurum on 20 May 1900. He was the third child of Sarkis Yerganian and Mariam Soghoyan-Yerganian. He attended a local school in Erzurum.

Yerganian, who witnessed the Armenian genocide, sought refuge in the Caucasus. In 1917 he enlisted for the Armenian volunteer detachments and fought for General Dro in the Battle of Bash Abaran. After the victory over the Ottoman forces and the establishment of the Democratic Republic of Armenia in 1918, Yerganian enlisted in Operation Nemesis, the covert operation led by a special body of the Armenian Revolutionary Federation aimed at assassinating all key organizers of massacres against Armenians both in the Ottoman Empire and in Azerbaijan.

Operation Nemesis 
After Armenia lost its independence to the Bolsheviks, Yerganian went to Tbilisi where he and Misak Grigorian were assigned to assassinate former Prime Minister of the Democratic Republic of Azerbaijan Fatali Khan Khoyski and leader of the Musavat party Khan Mahmadov. On 19 June 1920, they met at Tbilisi's Yerevan Square as they awaited a signal from their accomplices. When Khoiski and Mahmadov were 100 to 150 meters away, they immediately opened fire on them. Khoiski was killed instantly, but Mahmadov, who was only wounded, escaped.

After his task in Tbilisi was finished, Yerganian went to Constantinople where he attempted to recruit more avengers for the operation.

Yerganian and Arshavir Shirakian were later given the task to assassinate both Cemal Azmi and Behaeddin Sakir who were in Berlin. Shirakian managed to kill only Azmi and wound Sakir. Yerganian immediately ran after Sakir and killed him with a shot to his head.

Later life 
After his action in Germany, Yerganian went to Austria and then to Bucharest, where he lived until he moved to Buenos Aires in 1927. In Buenos Aires Yerganian became an editor for the local "Armenia" newspaper.

In 1931 he married Zabel Paragyan and had one daughter.

After contracting tuberculosis, Yerganian moved to the province of Cordoba where he died on 2 August 1934, at the age of 34. He is buried at the ARF Antranig Club in the city of Cordoba.

References 

1900 births
1934 deaths
Armenian assassins
People from Erzurum
Witnesses of the Armenian genocide
Armenians from the Ottoman Empire
Tuberculosis deaths in Argentina
Soviet emigrants to Romania
Romanian emigrants to Argentina
20th-century deaths from tuberculosis